Bible believer (also Bible-believer, Bible-believing Christian, Bible-believing Church) is a self-description by conservative Christians to differentiate their teachings from others who they see as placing non-biblical or extra-biblical tradition as higher or equal in authority to the Bible. 

In normal usage, "Bible believer" means an individual or organization that believes the Protestant Bible is true in some significant way. However, this combination of words is given a unique meaning in fundamentalist Protestant circles, where it is equated with the belief that the Christian Bible "contains no theological contradictions, historical discrepancies, or other such 'errors'", otherwise known as biblical inerrancy.

See also
 Bible Christian Church
 Bible Christian Church (vegetarian)
 Bibliolatry
 Biblical literalism
 Christian fundamentalism
 Christian right
 Evangelicalism

References

Further reading
Ammerman, Nancy Tatom (1987). Bible Believers: Fundamentalists in the Modern World. New Jersey: Rutgers University Press. 
Boone, Kathleen C. (2002). The Bible Tells Them So: The Discourse of Protestant Fundamentalism. New York: SUNY Press. 

Christian fundamentalism
Protestantism